Crossroads, renamed and known as Sobo Central, currently as Brand Factory is a shopping mall in Mahalaxmi, Mumbai. Opened in September 1999 by Piramal Holdings Ltd., a subsidiary of a major pharmaceutical group, it is Mumbai's oldest shopping mall. It is also India's second oldest mall management company, from Chennai's Spencer Plaza.

Features 
 Teflon roof
 Video-screen walls
 Car elevators

References 

Shopping malls in Mumbai
1993 establishments in Maharashtra
Shopping malls established in 1993
20th-century architecture in India